Kim Kap-soo (born April 7, 1957) is a South Korean actor. Since his acting debut in 1977, Kim has had a long career on the stage, in television dramas and film. In addition to acting full-time, he also has his own master class acting studio.

Filmography

Film

Television series

Web series

Television show

Documentary narration

Music video appearances

Theater

Awards and nominations

References

South Korean male television actors
South Korean male film actors
South Korean male stage actors
1957 births
Living people
Gwangsan Kim clan
Best New Actor Paeksang Arts Award (television) winners